Alcindo Sartori (born 21 October 1967) is a retired Brazilian football player.

He gained experience playing for Flamengo's reserves and made his first team debut in 1986. He played with players like Zico and in 1987 he was a member in the U-20 Brazil national team which participated in the FIFA World Youth Championship, scoring 2 goals in 4 games.

Alcindo played for Flamengo and São Paulo in the Campeonato Brasileiro.

In 1993, he joined Kashima Antlers in Japan, and with Zico he played a key role in winning the first stage of the J1 League championship, losing in the finals against second stage winners Verdy Kawasaki.

Club statistics

Performances in major international tournaments

References

External links

1967 births
Living people
Brazilian footballers
Brazil under-20 international footballers
Brazilian expatriate footballers
Campeonato Brasileiro Série A players
J1 League players
Japan Football League (1992–1998) players
Kashima Antlers players
Tokyo Verdy players
Hokkaido Consadole Sapporo players
CR Flamengo footballers
São Paulo FC players
Grêmio Foot-Ball Porto Alegrense players
Fluminense FC players
Sport Club Corinthians Paulista players
Associação Desportiva Cabofriense players
Expatriate footballers in Japan
Sportspeople from Paraná (state)
Association football forwards